Taiwo Asaolu is a Nigerian professor of accounting and finance. He is also a Fellow (FCA) of the Institute of Chartered Accountants of Nigeria.  He is the former Dean, faculty of administration, Obafemi Awolowo University, Ile-Ife, Osun State, Nigeria.

References

Living people
Nigerian accountants
Year of birth missing (living people)
Academic staff of Obafemi Awolowo University